The 2008 Louisiana Democratic presidential primary took place on February 9, 2008, and had 56 delegates at stake. The winner in each of Louisiana's seven congressional districts was awarded all of that district's delegates, totaling 37. Another 29 delegates were awarded to the statewide winner, Barack Obama. The 56 delegates represented Louisiana at the Democratic National Convention in Denver, Colorado. Ten other unpledged delegates, known as superdelegates, also attended the convention and cast their votes as well.

Polls

Results

Analysis

With its heavily African American population, Barack Obama solidly defeated Hillary Clinton in Louisiana. According to exit polls, 48 percent of voters in the Louisiana Democratic Primary were African Americans and they opted for Obama by a margin of 86-13 compared to the 47 percent of white voters who backed Clinton by a margin of 58-30. Obama won all age groups and educational attainment levels in Louisiana except senior citizens aged 65 and over and those who did not complete high school. Obama won voters who identified as Democrats and those who identified as Republicans as well as Independents and all ideological groups. Regarding religion, Obama won all major denominations, including Roman Catholics, a group that often strongly backed Clinton nationwide. 

Obama did best in the more rural counties in Louisiana which are majority-African American. He also performed extremely well in the urban areas of New Orleans, Shreverport-Bossier City, and Lake Charles. Obama also performed extremely well in Cajun Country. Clinton did best in the areas north of New Orleans and east of Baton Rouge in the 1st Congressional District, which is among the most conservative in Louisiana and the South at large. She also performed well in rural counties in Central Louisiana and those along the Louisiana-Texas border that are majority white. John Edwards finished in third, securing only about 3.4% of the vote and no delegates.

See also
 2008 Democratic Party presidential primaries
 2008 Louisiana Republican presidential caucuses and primary

References

Louisiana
Democratic primary
2008